The Price Is Right is an American television game show created by Bob Stewart, Mark Goodson and Bill Todman where contestants compete by guessing the prices of merchandise to win cash and prizes. Contestants are selected from the studio audience as the announcer calls their names and invokes the show's famous catchphrase, "Come on down!"

The program premiered on September 4, 1972, on CBS. Bob Barker was the series's longest-running host from its 1972 debut until his retirement in June 2007, when Drew Carey took over. Barker was accompanied by a series of announcers, beginning with Johnny Olson, followed by Rod Roddy and Rich Fields. In April 2011, George Gray became the announcer. The show has used several models, most notably Anitra Ford, Janice Pennington, Dian Parkinson, Holly Hallstrom, and Kathleen Bradley. While retaining some elements of the original 1956 version of the show, the 1972 version has added many new distinctive gameplay elements.

The Price Is Right has aired over 9,000 episodes since its debut. It is the longest-running game show in the United States and is one of the longest-running network series in United States television history. The 50th season premiered September 13, 2021.

In a 2007 article, TV Guide named it the "greatest game show of all time".

On March 2, 2022, it was announced that The Price is Right would be inducted into the NAB Broadcasting Hall of Fame. Host Drew Carey and executive producer Evelyn Warfel accepted the award at The Achievement in Broadcasting Awards on the NAB Show main stage in Las Vegas on April 24, 2022.

Gameplay
The gameplay of the show consists of four distinct competition elements, in which nine preliminary contestants (or six, depending on the episode's running time) are eventually narrowed to two finalists who compete in the game's final element, the "Showcase".

One Bid
At the beginning of the show, four contestants are called from the audience by the announcer to take a spot in the front row behind bidding podiums, which are embedded into the front edge of the stage. This area is known as "Contestants' Row" or "Bidders Row". After calling each selected contestant's name, the announcer shouts "Come on down!", a phrase which has become a trademark of the show.

The four contestants in Contestants' Row compete in a bidding round to determine which contestant will play the next pricing game (the round is known as "One Bid", which gets its name and format from one of two types of bidding rounds that existed on the 1950s version of the show). A prize is shown and each contestant gives a single bid for the item. In the first One Bid game of each episode, bidding begins with the contestant on the viewer's left-to-right, usually the first contestant who came down to the Contestants' Row. In subsequent One Bid rounds, the order of bidding still moves from the viewer's left-to-right, but it begins with the contestant most recently called down. Contestants are instructed to bid in whole dollars since the retail price of the item is rounded to the nearest dollar, and another contestant's bid cannot be duplicated. The contestant whose bid is closest to the actual retail price of the prize without going over wins that prize and gets to play the subsequent pricing game.

If all four contestants overbid, several short buzzer tones sound, the lowest bid is announced and the bids are erased. The host then instructs the contestants to re-bid below the lowest previous bid.

If a contestant bids the actual retail price, a bell rings and the contestant wins a cash bonus in addition to the prize. From the introduction of the bonus in 1977 until 1998, the "perfect bid" bonus was $100, it was permanently increased to the current $500 in 1998. On The Price Is Right $1,000,000 Spectacular, the bonus was $1,000.

After each pricing game except the final one, another contestant is called to "come on down" to fill the spot of the contestant who played the previous pricing game. The newest contestant bids first in each One Bid round. Contestants who fail to win a One Bid round and do not make it onstage to play a pricing game receive consolation prizes, currently $300, often sponsored by companies revealed by the announcer near the end of the show, before the Showcase.

A 1996 study from Stanford University analyzed the bidding behavior of contestants, noting that they rarely attempted to optimize their bidding strategies but that accuracy tended to improve the longer they stayed in Contestants Row. A 2019 study from Harvard University noted that the accuracy of the average bid fell substantially over the course of the show's run—from 8% lower than the actual retail price at the series start in 1972 to over 20% by 2010—before stabilizing as Carey's hosting tenure progressed; the study concluded that accuracy correlated with inflation and hypothesized that periods of high inflation make people more attentive to prices, while also surmising that increasing e-commerce has made people less attentive to prices overall.

Pricing games

After winning the One Bid, the contestant joins the host onstage for the opportunity to win additional prizes or cash by playing a pricing game. After the pricing game ends, a new contestant is selected for Contestants' Row and the process is repeated.

Six pricing games are played on each hour-long episode; three games per episode were played in the original half-hour format. Pricing game formats vary widely, ranging from simple dilemma games in which a contestant chooses one of two options to win to complex games of chance or skill in which guessing prices increases the odds of winning. On a typical hour-long episode, two games are played for a car, one game is played for a cash prize and the other three games offer expensive household merchandise or trips. Usually, at least one of the six games involves the pricing of grocery items, while another usually involves smaller prizes that can be used to win a larger prize package.

Originally, five pricing games were in the rotation. Since then, more games have been created and added to the rotation and, starting with the 60-minute expansion in 1975, the rate at which games premiered increased. Some pricing games were eventually discontinued, while others have been a mainstay since the show's debut in 1972. As of 2017, the rotation is among 77 games. On the 1994 syndicated version hosted by Doug Davidson, the rules of several games were modified and other aesthetic changes were made. Notably, the grocery products used in some games on the daytime version were replaced by small merchandise prizes, generally valued at less than $100. Beginning in 2008, episodes of The Price Is Right $1,000,000 Spectacular featured rule changes to some pricing games which rewarded a $1 million bonus to the contestant if specific goals were achieved while playing the pricing game.

Showcase Showdown

Since the show's expansion to 60 minutes in 1975, each episode features two playings of the Showcase Showdown, occurring after the third and sixth pricing games. Each playing features the three contestants who played the preceding pricing games spinning "The Big Wheel" to determine who advances to the Showcase, the show's finale. The contestants play in the order of the value of their winnings thus far (including the One Bid), with the contestant who has won the most spinning last.

The wheel contains 20 sections showing values from 5¢ to $1.00, in increments of five cents. Contestants are allowed a maximum of two spins. The first contestant spins the wheel and may choose to stop with his or her score or spin again, adding the value of the second spin to their first. The second contestant then spins the wheel and tries to match or beat the leader's score; if he or she fails to do so, the contestant must spin again. If the second contestant's first spin matches or beats the score of the first contestant, he or she has the option of stopping or spinning again. The third contestant then spins; if his or her score is less than the leader then he or she will be required to spin again. In the event the second or third contestant's first spin ties the score of the leader, he or she will be given the option of spinning again as an alternative to entering a "spin-off" as described below.

If the total score of any contestant is less than that of the current leader, is beaten by the score of any subsequent contestant, or is over $1.00, the contestant is eliminated from the game. The contestant whose score is nearest to $1.00 without going over advances to the Showcase at the end of the episode. Any spin that fails to make at least one complete revolution does not count; the contestant is given the opportunity to spin again, and if the contestant has visible difficulty in physically performing the task, the host is allowed to assist them.

If the first two contestants both spin twice and go over $1.00, the last contestant automatically advances to the Showcase and is given only one spin to determine their score to ensure that a contestant advances to the showcase. Any contestant whose score equals $1.00 (from either the first spin or the sum of two spins) receives a $1,000 bonus and, since December 1978, is allowed a bonus spin. The contestant wins an additional $10,000 for landing on either 5¢ or 15¢ (which are adjacent to the $1.00 space and painted green), or an additional $25,000 for landing on $1.00. From December 1978 to July 17, 2008, the bonuses were $5,000 and $10,000 for landing on a green section and the $1.00, respectively. If the wheel stops on any other amount or fails to make at least one revolution, the contestant wins no more money. The wheel is positioned on 5¢ prior to the bonus spin so that it cannot land on a winning prize without making a complete revolution.

Two or more contestants who are tied with the leading score compete in a "spin-off." Each contestant is allowed one additional spin and the contestant with the higher score advances to the Showcase. Multiple spin-offs are played until the tie is broken. Those who hit $1.00 in their spin-off spin still get $1,000 and a bonus spin. If two or more contestants tie with a score of $1.00, their bonus spins also determine their spin-off score. Only the spin-off score, not any bonus money won, determines which contestant moves on to the Showcase. For example, a person who wins the $10,000 bonus for landing on 15¢ loses the spin-off if their opponent lands on 20¢ or more. A tie in a bonus spin spin-off means the ensuing second spin-off will be spun with no bonuses available. Each spin must make one complete revolution in order to qualify. If a player's bonus spin spin-off does not make a complete revolution, the contestant must spin again, and the spin will be scored as in a second round of a spin-off (no bonuses).

Showcase
At the end of the episode, the two Showcase Showdown winners (or the two highest winners on half-hour-long episodes) advance to the Showcase. A "showcase" of prizes (currently two or three prizes) is presented and the top winner has the option of placing a bid on the total value of the showcase or passing the showcase to the runner-up, who is then required to bid. A second showcase is then presented and the contestant who had not bid on the first showcase makes their bid. Unlike the One Bid, the contestant bidding on the second showcase may bid the same amount as their opponent on the first showcase, since the two contestants are bidding on different prize packages. The contestant who has bid nearer to the price of their own showcase without going over wins the prizes in their showcase.

Any contestant who overbids automatically loses regardless of their opponent's result. If both contestants overbid, neither wins their showcase. Since 1974, the winning contestant wins both showcases if the bid is within a specified amount from the actual retail price of their own showcase without going over. Until 1998, the amount was less than $100. In 1998, it became the current $250 or less. The 2017 documentary Perfect Bid: The Contestant Who Knew Too Much tells the story of the only time a contestant bid the exact price of a showcase.

Personnel

Hosts

Bob Barker began hosting The Price Is Right on September 4, 1972, and completed a 35-year tenure on June 15, 2007. Barker was hired as host while still hosting the stunt comedy show Truth or Consequences. His retirement coincided with his 50th year as a television host. His final show aired on June 15, 2007, and was repeated in primetime, leading into the network's coverage of the 34th Daytime Emmy Awards. In addition to hosting, Barker became Executive Producer of the show in March 1988 when Frank Wayne died and continued as such until his retirement, gaining significant creative control over the series between 2000 and his 2007 retirement. He was also responsible for creating several of the show's pricing games, as well as launching The Price Is Right $1,000,000 Spectacular primetime spin-off. Reruns of Barker's final season were aired throughout the summer from the Monday after his final show (June 18, 2007) until the Friday before Drew Carey's debut as host (October 12, 2007), when the season 35 finale was re-aired. During his time as host, Barker missed only one taping of four episodes; Dennis James, then hosting the syndicated nighttime version of the show, filled in for him on these shows in December 1974. In 1981, shortly after the death of his wife Dorothy Jo, Barker became an animal rights advocate and began signing off each episode with "Help control the pet population: have your pets spayed or neutered."  After Barker's retirement, Carey continued the tradition with the same sign-off.

On October 31, 2006, Barker announced that he would retire from the show at the end of season 35. In March 2007, CBS and FremantleMedia began a search for the next host of the show. Carey, who was hosting Power of 10 at the time, was chosen and, in a July 23, 2007, interview on Late Show with David Letterman, made the announcement. Carey's first show aired October 15, 2007. Barker has made several guest appearances since Carey took over as host: on the April 16, 2009 episode to promote his autobiography, Priceless Memories, on December 12, 2013, as part of "Pet Adoption Week" that coincided with his 90th birthday, and on the episode which aired on April Fools' Day in 2015, hosting the first One Bid and pricing game as part of April Fool's Day.

The 2013 April Fools' show featured Carey and announcer George Gray modeling the prizes while the show's models performed hosting and announcing duties for the day. On the April Fools' Day episode in 2014, Craig Ferguson, Carey's former castmate from The Drew Carey Show, and Shadoe Stevens hosted and announced, swapping places with Carey and Gray respectively, who performed the same roles on the previous night's episode of The Late Late Show.

Announcers
Johnny Olson, the announcer for many Goodson-Todman shows of the era, was the program's original announcer until his death in October 1985. Olson was replaced by Rod Roddy in February 1986, who remained with the program until shortly before his death in October 2003. Los Angeles meteorologist Rich Fields took over as the announcer in April 2004 and stayed on until the end of season 38 in August 2010. Following a change of direction and a search for an announcer with more experience in improvisational comedy, veteran TV host George Gray joined the show as the announcer on the April 18, 2011 episode. During periods in which a permanent announcer was not filling the role, a number of announcers auditioned for the position. In addition to Roddy, Gene Wood, Rich Jeffries, and Bob Hilton auditioned to replace Olson. Former Family Feud announcer Burton Richardson, Paul Boland, and former Supermarket Sweep announcer Randy West substituted for Roddy during his illnesses. In addition to West and Richardson, Daniel Rosen, Art Sanders, Roger Rose, Don Bishop and current Wheel of Fortune announcer Jim Thornton also auditioned for the role eventually filled by Fields. Richardson substituted for Fields while he recovered from laryngitis in December 2006. In addition to Gray, TV host JD Roberto, comedians Jeff B. Davis, Brad Sherwood, and David H. Lawrence XVII, and actor/comedian Steve White also auditioned for the role.

Models 

To help display its many prizes, the show has featured several models who were known, during Barker's time on the show, as "Barker's Beauties". Some longer-tenured Barker's Beauties included Kathleen Bradley (1990–2000), Holly Hallstrom (1977–1995), Dian Parkinson (1975–1993), and Janice Pennington (1972–2000). Pennington and Bradley were both dismissed from the program in 2000, allegedly because they had given testimony on Hallstrom's behalf in the wrongful termination litigation she pursued against Barker and the show. Following the departures of Nikki Ziering, Heather Kozar and Claudia Jordan in the 2000s, producers decided to use a rotating cast of models (up to ten) until the middle of season 37, after which the show reverted to five regular models. Since 2021, the models include Rachel Reynolds, Amber Lancaster, Manuela Arbeláez, James O'Halloran, Devin Goda, and Alexis Gaube (most recently of Card Sharks). Carey does not use a collective name for the models, but refers to them by name, hoping that the models will be able to use the show as a "springboard" to further their careers. In a change from previous policy, the models appearing on a given episode are named individually in the show's credits and are formally referred as "The Price Is Right models" when collectively grouped at events. Since season 37, the show often uses a guest model for certain prizes, often crossing over from another CBS property or come courtesy of the company providing the prize. Some such models have been male, especially for musical instruments, tools, trucks and motorcycles, and used in guest appearances during the Showcase. Owing to the traditionally female demographic of daytime television shows, along with the pregnancies of Reynolds and Osborne, CBS announced that the game show would add a male model for a week during season 41, fitting with other countries with the franchise that have used an occasional male model. The show held an internet search for the man in an online competition that featured Mike Richards, the show's executive producer, Reynolds, Lancaster, Osborne and Arbeláez serving as judges and mentors during the web series, narrated by Gray. Viewers selected the winner in October 2012. On October 5, 2012, CBS announced that the winner of the male model online competition was Rob Wilson of Boston, Massachusetts. Wilson appeared as a model on episodes through April 15, 2014. A second male model search was conducted in 2014, with auditions taking place during the FIFA World Cup break between May and July 2014. On December 8, 2014, CBS announced that the winner of the second male model online competition was James O'Halloran.

Production staff
The game show production team of Mark Goodson and Bill Todman was responsible for producing the original as well as the revival versions of the game show. Goodson-Todman staffer Bob Stewart is credited with creating the original version of The Price Is Right. Roger Dobkowitz was the producer from 1984 to 2008, having worked with the program as a production staffer since the show's debut after graduating from San Francisco State University. Occasionally, Dobkowitz appeared on-camera when answering a question posed by the host, usually relating to the show's history or records. When he left the show at the end of season 36, Variety reported that it was unclear whether he was retiring or was fired, although Carey indicated in a later interview with Esquire that Dobkowitz was fired. As of 2011, the show uses multiple producers, all long-time staffers. Adam Sandler (not to be confused with the actor) is the producer and director of the show. Stan Blits, who joined the show in 1980 and Sue MacIntyre are the co-producers. Stan Blits is also the contestant coordinator for the show. In 2007, he wrote the book Come on Down, that goes behind the scenes of the show. In the book he dispels the myth that contestants are chosen at random, and gives readers an inside look at how shows are planned and produced. Kathy Greco joined the show in 1975 and became producer in 2008; she announced her retirement on October 8, 2010, on the show's website, effective at the end of the December 2010 tapings. Her last episode as producer, which aired January 27, 2011, featured a theme in tribute to her. The show's official website featured a series of videos including an interview with Greco as a tribute to her 35 years in the days leading up to her final episode. Frank Wayne, a Goodson-Todman staffer since the 1950s, was the original executive producer of the CBS version of the show. Barker assumed that role after Wayne's death in March 1988, as previously stated. Previous producers have included Jay Wolpert, Barbara Hunter and Phil Wayne Rossi (Wayne's son). Michael Dimich assumed the director's chair in June 2011. Marc Breslow, Paul Alter, Bart Eskander, and Rich DiPirro each served long stints previously as director. Former associate directors Andrew Felsher and Fred Witten, as well as technical director Glenn Koch, have directed episodes strictly on a fill-in basis. Sandler began directing episodes in 2012, and became the official director in 2013. Aside from Barker, the show's production staff remained intact after Carey became host. FremantleMedia executive Syd Vinnedge was named the program's new executive producer, with Richards becoming co-executive producer after Dobkowitz's firing. Richards was a candidate to replace Barker as host in 2007, before Carey was ultimately chosen. Richards succeeded Vinnedge as executive producer when the 2009–10 season started, with Tracy Verna Soiseth joining Richards as co-executive producer in 2010. Vinnedge remains credited as an executive consultant to the show. Richards oversaw a major overhaul of the show, dismissing most of the personnel who had served under Barker and Dobkowitz in an effort to improve the show's performance in key demographics. Richards left the show at the conclusion of the 2018–19 season to join Sony Pictures Television for as an executive producer for their game shows. Evelyn Warfel was named executive producer for the 2019–20 season.

Production

Audience and contestant selection
Many audience members arrive early on the day of a taping, and often camp out the night before to attend. Most have already received tickets for that day's show, although some hope to get same-day tickets. Audience members are then given the iconic name tags with a temporary identification number, which is also written on the person's ticket. A Social Security Number (or some national I.D. number for non-U.S. audience members) is also required to be submitted. Audience members are eventually brought through in groups of twelve for brief interviews with the production staff. Contrary to popular belief, contestant names are not chosen at random; rather, the interviews determine possible selections for the nine contestants per taping from among the pool of approximately 325 audience members. Since 1988, the minimum age for audience members has been 18, prior to 1988, teenagers and children were present in the audience. With few exceptions, anyone at least 18 years old who attends a taping of the show has the potential to become a contestant. Those ineligible include current candidates for political office, employees of Paramount Global or its affiliates, RTL Group or any firm involved in offering prizes for the show. Contestants who have appeared on a different game show within the previous year or either two other game shows or any version of The Price Is Right itself within the past ten years are also ineligible. The show's staff alerts potential contestantsin person, on the show's website and on the tickets themselvesto dress in "street clothes" and not to wear costumes, such as those used to attract attention on Let's Make a Deal, another show that featured contestants selected from the audience. In June 2008 producers disallowed audience members from wearing fake eyeglasses designed to look similar to those worn by Carey, a restriction that has since been relaxed. Instead, contestants will often wear shirts with hand-decorated slogans. Members of the Armed Forces are often in uniform. Cell phones, tape recorders, backpacks, price lists and portable electronic devices are not allowed in the studio. Prospective contestants obtain tickets by contacting a third-party ticketing operator via the show's website, which is promoted on-air during the broadcast. Prior to 2011, ticketing was directly through CBS, originally via mail, with online ticket access added in 2005. The mail practice ended after CBS began outsourcing ticketing to the third-party operator.

Occasionally, episodes are taped with special audience restrictions, including active duty and retired military personnel. Similar primetime episodes were taped in 2002 in the aftermath of the September 11 attacks and in light of the subsequent war in Afghanistan: one honoring each branch of the United States military and a sixth episode honoring police officers and firefighters. An annual military episode has been taped since season 38 in 2008; such episodes were originally broadcast on Veterans Day, but the airdate was moved to Independence Day during season 41 (2013). These episodes feature an all-military audience, a Marine band playing the winner's service anthem, and contestants being called by rank. The 2008 episode contained a unique rule in which each One Bid featured one contestant from the Army, Navy, Air Force and Marines, and One Bid winners also won a $1,000 gift card. As each contestant won his/her way onstage, he/she was replaced by a member of the same branch of service. Most civilian attendees were retired or disabled veterans or family members of military personnel. The 2009 version eliminated this unique rule. Additionally, members from the United States Coast Guard were invited to the show.

Beginning in 2009, some episodes have featured special themes with two contestants competing as teams, such as married or engaged couples for Valentine's Day and the "Ultimate Wedding Shower" episode. There have also been episodes with children who are minors (normally not allowed to compete) teamed with a parent (for Mother's Day and Father's Day) or grandparent (for Grandparents Day), as well as teen drivers and students for "Ultimate Spring Break" and "Back to School". In these cases the adult player (not the minor) must make all final decisions in the game play, such as when calling numbers or prices.

Taping
Except for the 30th Anniversary Special, which was taped at Harrah's Rio in Las Vegas, Nevada, The Price Is Right has been taped in Studio 33 in Television City Studios in Los Angeles, California, for its entire run. The studio, which is also used for other television productions, was renamed the Bob Barker Studio in the host's honor on the ceremonial 5,000th episode taped in March 1998. When Carey became host, there was talk of the show traveling in the future. The program is usually produced in about an hour, although if there is a guest involved, some tapings will last longer because of question and answer sessions by the audience and the guest, which the host usually moderates. Typically, the show tapes two episodes per day (mid-day and late afternoon tapings) with Monday through Wednesday tapings. The program is taped in advance of its airdate. For example, the show broadcast on February 28, 2008, was taped on January 16. After resuming tapings in October 2020 following a pandemic-related delay, starting in season 49 (taped behind closed doors with pandemic restrictions with a late start and accelerated taping), three episodes were taped each day, normally with three taping days per week (Sunday through Tuesday, with a morning, midday, and afternoon session). As with many other shows that start production in the summer, the lead time varies during the season, as many as fifteen weeks to as little as one day. The audience is entertained by the announcer before taping begins and in case of guests, the guest will answer questions from the audience. After the taping session, there is a drawing for a door prize.

On some episodes, all members of the audience receive a prize from a sponsor or celebrity guest; those prizes are usually mentioned in the Showcase (such as a complimentary slice of Papa John's Pizza, an NHL Winter Classic game puck, a couples' gift box from Hershey's or a book authored by a guest). Television and Internet viewers have also been directed to the show's official website to enter a drawing for a similar prize offered to all viewers or another prize related to the special offer (such as the Rock of Ages signed CD). Some episodes are taped "out-of-order" so that a specific episode will air after other episodes have aired. Notably, the Christmas Week episodes are usually taped in early December outside of the regular rotation. An episode may be taped out-of-order if a prize package reflects a trip to an event that is taking place close to the date that episode will air (primarily with CBS properties such as the NCAA Men's Division I Basketball Championship, and various NFL on CBS games, most notably Super Bowl games airing on CBS since Carey took over, but other games are offered as the Super Bowl becomes quadrennial as of the  NFL contract; CBS' next Super Bowl is during the 2024 NFL season). Other episodes may be aired out-of-order because of game-related incidents or situations beyond the network's control. Most instances of episodes airing out of order occur when the show is taped far in advance or when a natural disaster recently occurred at a trip venue featured in an episode.

In March 2023, it was announced that The Price Is Right will be moving to Haven Studios at the start of season 52, after taping at Television City since the show debuted in 1972. This is due to Television City's owners, Hackman Capital Partners, planning a $1.25 billion refurbishment to the complex, with shows still taping at the studio finding other locations.  Most RTL Group television shows produced in Los Angeles will also move to Haven, which RTL Group (which has owned Price since 2000) is an investor.

COVID-19 pandemic impact on production
In March 2020, production of The Price is Right was suspended as a result of the COVID-19 pandemic. On the September 16, 2020 episode of The Athletic's Starkville podcast, Drew Carey informed the podcast that Fremantle intended to resume taping in October 2020 with only essential personnel, including 27 contestants for a given day (nine contestants per show, three shows a day) of taping in the studio. On October 5, 2020, Deadline Hollywood interviewed executive producer Evelyn Warfel about protocol changes for the show. Social media posts from announcer George Gray and model James O'Halloran confirmed that taping had resumed.

Season 49 episodes had a redesigned set with no audience, and four socially-distanced podiums in place of Contestants' Row. For season 50, the show brought back a limited audience of approximately 50 people seated in pods, similar to those used on episodes of Let's Make a Deal since the previous year (2020). Contestants' Row returned, but with added space between contestants. The setup remains the same for season 51.

Prizes
Companies donate prizes in exchange for advertising. According to the CBC Radio One series Under the Influence, each episode has a script about 30 pages long, consisting primarily of what is essentially advertising copy. The book Come On Down!: Behind the Big Doors at "The Price Is Right" by staffer Stan Blits says the prizes require acres of warehouse space to store. Since Season 37 (2008), the program purchased certain prizes at outlet stores in an effort to diversify and upscale the prizes being offered on the show, in an effort to aim at younger demographics (such as college-age students, which has been noted as a popular demographic for the program).

Production company
The version of the series that began in 1972 was originally "A Mark Goodson–Bill Todman Production" in association with CBS. After Todman died in July 1979, the unit became known as simply Mark Goodson Productions and referred to as such on The Price Is Right from 1984 to June 2007. Today, the series is produced by Fremantle and copyrighted by The Price Is Right Productions, Inc., a joint venture of RTL Group and CBS. For the sake of tradition and through special permission from RTL's subsidiary Fremantle, the show continued to use the Mark Goodson Productions name, logo and announcement at the end of each episode until Barker's retirement, even after Fremantle purchased and absorbed the Goodson-Todman holdings. The show was credited as a FremantleMedia production from 2007 to 2018, after the company's name change in 2018, it is now credited simply as a Fremantle production.

Broadcast history
The Price Is Right premiered on September 4, 1972, at 10:30 a.m. ET (9:30 a.m. CT) on CBS, one of three game shows to debut that day, the other two being The Joker's Wild at 10:00 a.m. ET and Gambit at 11:00 a.m. ET. The show was first billed as The New Price Is Right to distinguish itself from the earlier/original version (1956–65) hosted by Bill Cullen, but it proved so popular in its own right that, in June 1973, Goodson-Todman decided to drop the word "New" from its title. On March 26, 1973, CBS moved The Price Is Right to 3:00 p.m. ET, pairing it with Match Game as part of what became the highest-rated pairing in daytime, it ran a close second to the NBC soap opera Another World. The show remained in that time slot until August 11, 1975, when it permanently returned to the morning lineup at 10:30 a.m. ET. Over the next several years, Price would face a variety of game shows on NBC; then, as now, ABC did not program that timeslot, leaving its affiliates to do it themselves.

During the week of September 8–12, 1975, The Price is Right experimented with a sixty-minute episode format, during what it called "Anniversary Week" (the third anniversary of its premiere). The Anniversary Week included a prototypical circular Showcase Showdown spinner wheel used only for that week of shows. The Anniversary Week experiment was a ratings success, and quickly led to the announcement on September 30, 1975, of the permanent expansion of The Price is Right to sixty minutes, effective November 3, 1975; its start time moved to 10:00 a.m. ET. From March 7, 1977, to November 4, 1977, The Price Is Right aired at 10:30 a.m. It then returned to 10:00 a.m. for just five weeks. On December 12, 1977, the show moved back to 10:30 a.m. and remained there until April 20, 1979, when it assumed the 11:00 a.m. ET slot where it has remained ever since.

The format of the show has since remained virtually unchanged. New pricing games are generally added each year, while others are retired. In addition, prizes and pricing games have kept pace with inflation, with games originally designed for four-digit prices of prizes (most often cars) adjusted to allow for five-digit prices. While the set has seen numerous redesigns and upgrades over the years, the show has maintained a similar aesthetic element from its premiere in 1972.

In season 36, CBS began offering full episodes of the show available for free viewing on the network's website. The show also began broadcasting in high definition with The Price Is Right $1,000,000 Spectacular primetime specials (the normal daytime version continued to air in 4:3 standard definition). The show made the full transition to HD broadcasts beginning with season 37. During the weeks of September 28, 2009, September 20, 2010, and October 4, 2010, two new episodes aired each weekday on CBS. In 2009, the additional episodes filled a gap between the cancellation of the daytime drama Guiding Light and the debut of Let's Make a Deal. In 2010, the extra episodes aired between the cancellation of As the World Turns and the debut of The Talk. The intervening week offered a second episode of Let's Make a Deal. The 2009 second episode aired in the timeslot vacated by Guiding Light at 10:00 a.m. or 3:00 p.m. ET/PT, depending on the affiliate's choice. In 2010, the second episode aired in the former As the World Turns time slot, at 2:00 p.m. ET/PT.

Syndicated productions
Three syndicated versions of The Price Is Right have aired. The first two followed the same format as the half-hour daytime version but were intended to air on most stations in the early evening in the pre-prime time slot, and as such, they were referred to by the announcer as "the nighttime Price Is Right."

1972–1980
A weekly syndicated version debuted the week after the daytime premiere and continued to air until September 1980. It was distributed by Viacom Enterprises, which had started as the syndication arm of CBS. When Mark Goodson devised the revival of Price for the 1972–73 season, it was intended for a nighttime broadcast only under new rules for early-prime syndication, and Goodson named Dennis James to host the show. When CBS commissioned a new weekday daytime version, Goodson also wanted James to host that show, but CBS wanted Barker, who was still hosting the syndicated Truth or Consequences at the time, to take it. Barker preferred to host The Joker's Wild, but CBS, again, insisted that he host Price instead.

James eventually hosted a taping day (four half-hour episodes) of the daytime show in December 1974 when Barker fell ill; those episodes were broadcast on and around Christmas Day. James did so concurrently with another daytime hosting gig, on the NBC version of Name That Tune, another revived format from the 1950s.

The two versions were largely similar at the beginning, as both were called The New Price Is Right. Some games had rule differences because of the larger budget and less commercial time on the nighttime show; for example, Double Prices was played for two prizes instead of one.

This version retained the 1972 half-hour format for its entire run and never adopted the daytime show's Double Showcase rule or the Showcase Showdown added to the daytime format when it expanded to an hour in 1975. The word "New" was dropped from the program's name starting in the second season, being titled simply The Price Is Right (as the daytime show was by this time as well) from that point onward, and was often referred to on the air by James and Olson as "the nighttime Price Is Right." In most of the U.S., stations carried the syndicated Price as one of other programs airing in the timeslot (7:30 p.m. ET) immediately before primetime which was created by the 1971 FCC Prime Time Access Rule.

Though the nighttime version originally had higher ratings than the CBS daytime version, by 1975, the syndicated ratings started to drop. After the fifth nighttime season in 1977, when the contract with NBC's owned-and-operated stations ended, James's contract was not renewed. CBS's owned-and-operated stations picked the show up and the decision was made to hire Barker, to bring it in line with the daytime version. The series taped its 300th and final episode on March 12, 1980, and was cancelled after weekly syndicated game shows had fallen out of popularity in favor of daily offerings (such as Family Feud, which had expanded to daily syndication the same year The Nighttime Price Is Right ended). With a run of eight seasons, it was one of the longest-running weekly syndicated game shows of the era and the longest-running regularly-scheduled primetime version of Price (the 1957–1964 version aired seven seasons).

1985–86
Five years later, veteran host Tom Kennedy starred in a new daily syndicated version, which also used the traditional half-hour format and was syndicated by The Television Program Source. Like the previous syndicated series, this version had a slightly larger budget than its daytime counterpart. A perfect bid during the One-Bids originally won that contestant a $100 bonus (like the daytime show did then), but was later increased to $500. This increased bonus permanently carried over to the daytime show in 1998.

Janice Pennington, Holly Hallstrom, and Dian Parkinson all reprised their roles for this series, as did Johnny Olson until his death. Unlike the daytime series, the syndicated series did not employ guest announcers after Olson died and instead named Gene Wood as his replacement. Wood, in turn, was replaced by Rod Roddy shortly after he was named as Olson's successor on the daytime series.

Like its predecessor, this syndicated edition of Price was intended to be aired in the Prime Time Access slots on local stations. However, unlike the 1970s, local stations found themselves bombarded with game shows and other series looking for spots on stations in an increasingly crowded market. It often resulted in shows like Price airing anywhere that they could be fit into a station's programming lineup, such as in the early-morning period or in late-night slots. As a consequence, the show was not able to find its intended audience and the ratings reports reflected that trouble.

Price was no exception, as many of the stations who bought the series placed it in those less desirable slots and the show could not find a foothold against the popular shows of the day, such as the runaway success of the syndicated Wheel of Fortune. Compared to some of the other shows on the market during this period, Price was a modest success, but it did not meet the very high expectations stations and Mark Goodson had for the series. As a result, the show was not renewed beyond its first season. A total of 170 episodes were produced, and they aired in first run from September 9, 1985, to May 30, 1986. During the six years it held the rights to Price, the Kennedy version is the only one of the three syndicated versions that was rerun by GSN.

The New Price Is Right

Eight years after the cancellation of Kennedy's Price Is Right, a new syndicated version premiered on September 12, 1994, hosted by Doug Davidson (of The Young and the Restless fame) and distributed by Paramount Domestic Television. This series featured several significant changes: eliminating Contestants' Row, a different format for the Showcase Showdown, a Showcase featuring only one contestant, a completely different set and a much larger budget (even when compared to the two previous syndicated runs) that gave contestants the potential to win up to five times what they could win on the daytime show. However, this version found even more trouble finding an audience than the 1985–86 series did and ended its run on January 27, 1995, after only 16 weeks of first-run shows. Several stylistic elements of this series, as well as many of its music cues, were later integrated into both the daytime version and nighttime specials.

CBS primetime specials and series
CBS attempted to break NBC's dominance of Thursday night prime time by The Cosby Show and Family Ties with a six-episode summer series, The Price Is Right Special, beginning in August 1986, but with no success. On August 23, 1996, CBS aired an hour-long 25th Anniversary Special, using the half-hour gameplay format and featuring a number of retrospective clips. The 30th Anniversary Special was recorded at Harrah's Rio All Suite Hotel and Casino in Las Vegas and aired on January 31, 2002. This one-time road trip enticed 5,000 potential contestants to line up for 900 available tickets, causing an incident that left one person injured. A second six-episode primetime series saluting various branches of the United States armed forces, police officers, and firefighters aired during the summer of 2002, as a tribute to the heroes of the September 11, 2001 attacks. During the series The Price Is Right Salutes, spinning $1.00 in a bonus spin during the Showcase Showdown was worth $100,000 instead of the usual $10,000.

The success of the primetime series, which aired mostly in the summer, along with the vogue of big-money game shows, led to CBS launching another primetime series in 2003, titled The Price Is Right $1,000,000 Spectacular. The 2007–08 Writers Guild of America strike and original success in the Nielsen ratings led CBS to commission ten more episodes of the primetime series. This series introduced set changes as the show was broadcast in high definition television for the first time and the set used for these episodes (except for the black floor) was moved to the daytime show in 2008. On the primetime series, larger and more expensive prizes were generally offered than on the daytime show. The Showcase frequently offered multiple or very expensive cars. In the first sixteen $1,000,000 Spectaculars, all hosted by Barker, the payoff for landing on the $1.00 during a bonus spin in the Showcase Showdown was increased to $1 million.

The rules for the $1 million bonus spin were later revised to offer the winner of the Showcase a spin if no other contestant had received a bonus spin in either Showcase Showdown. If both contestants overbid, an audience member was chosen at random to spin the wheel. This rule was again changed so that in the event of a double overbid, the contestant who overbid by the lower amount received the bonus spin for a chance at $1 million.

The million-dollar spin was eliminated in 2008, and instead, contestants were given two ways to win the top prize. One pricing game per episode was selected as a "million-dollar game", with a secondary objective needing to be met in order for the contestant to win the money. Contestants were also awarded the million-dollar bonus if they managed to win both Showcases, and the range the players had to come within was initially increased to $1,000, then reduced to $500. This format lasted one season (2008), which was made as replacement programming.

In 2016, The Price Is Right aired several primetime specials featuring cast members of CBS programs and hosts of CBS reality show franchises, including The Amazing Race, Big Brother, and Survivor. The episodes featured fans of the three programs playing alongside past participants from them. In 2019, a retitled version called The Price Is Right at Night featured episodes with cast members from SEAL Team and others with Seth Rogen. Celebrities are paired with civilian contestants competing to win prizes. If there is a celebrity involved, episodes feature charitable donations toward a cause championed by the celebrity guest, with the celebrity joining the civilian contestants during the program. These shows feature a cash equivalent to all prizes won that episode in pricing games donated to the celebrity's charity, and during the second Showcase Showdown, making one spin of the Showcase Showdown wheel, with the value multiplied by 10,000 to be donated to the celebrity's charity. Other specials included the season 49 premiere (which was delayed from September to October because of a six and a half month suspension of production), a salute to essential workers in light of the COVID-19 pandemic, and the cast of The Neighborhood playing as themselves for charity.

An August 2021 announcement detailed a two-hour primetime special The Price Is Right to air on September 30 in honor of its 50th season. The special featured a retrospective of memorable moments and outtakes from the show's history.

Gameshow Marathon
On May 31, 2006, The Price Is Right was featured on the series Gameshow Marathon, one of seven classic game shows hosted by talk show host and actress Ricki Lake. This version combined aspects of the Barker and Davidson versions with the celebrity contestants playing three pricing games, followed by a Showcase Showdown where the two contestants with the highest scores moved on to the Showcase. The winner of the Showcase also earned a spot in Finalists' Row. Fields was the announcer for this version which was taped in Studio 46. It also marked the first Price Is Right episode directed by DiPirro, who replaced Eskander as the director on the daytime show in January 2009.

The Price Is Right: The Barker Era (Pluto TV)

Pluto TV and Fremantle-owned Buzzr announced on November 30, 2020, that a new 24-hour channel named The Price Is Right: The Barker Era would be added to the Pluto TV lineup starting on December 1, 2020. The channel includes episodes of The Price is Right from the 1980s hosted by Barker, with some episodes airing for the first time since their original air dates. As part of the launch, a selection of holiday-themed episodes from the era aired on Christmas Eve 2020. The channel was added to The Roku Channel on February 8, 2022.

Fremantle has an exclusivity agreement with Paramount Global, the parent company of CBS and Pluto TV, giving Paramount the rights to all episodes of The Price Is Right from 1972 onward; for this reason, Fremantle cannot air Price reruns on Buzzr's over-the-air affiliates, nor can they license out the show to other networks.

Scientific research 
The show has attracted attention from economists, who analyze different elements as a natural experiment on strategic decision making.

Several papers focus on the One Bid game. Jonathan Berk and others show that a rational bidder should cut off an existing bid by bidding $1 above it.

Studies of the Showcase Showdown test the game-theoretic notion of subgame perfect equilibrium. In game-theoretic terms, The Showcase Showdown is a sequential game of perfect information for which the equilibrium can be found through backward induction. Several papers have solved the optimal strategy for particular spin outcomes. Rafael Tenorio and Timothy N. Cason studied a set of episodes from 1994 and 1995 and found evidence that players under-spin compared to the equilibrium prediction. Recently, a team of economists analyzed 40 years of data and found the same pattern of under-spinning, but only for the contestant who spins first. They found these mistakes are well explained by limited foresight; a sizeable fraction of contestants appear to myopically consider the next stage of the game. In line with learning, the researchers found the quality of contestants' choices improves over time.

Reality web show spinoffs

Road to Price
Road to Price is a six episode reality documentary show aired on the now-defunct CBS Innertube from September 20, 2006, to September 27, 2006. The program featured nine teenage boys driving to Los Angeles in a refurbished mini-school bus as they leave their hometown of Merrimack, New Hampshire in order to be on The Price is Right. The episode of The Price is Right featuring the cast aired September 27, 2006.

The Price is Right Male Model Search
Five episodes aired on their official website priceisright.com along with its YouTube page from October 27, 2014, to November 11, 2014. The series was created in order to replace the first male Price model Rob Wilson as he pursued an acting career in the online version of the ABC daytime soap opera All My Children. During the webisode series, hopeful contestants attempt to be selected as the next male model. Judges included Wilson, Mike Richards, Manuela Arbeláez, Amber Lancaster, Gwendolyn Osborne-Smith, Rachel Reynolds, and former Miss America Shanna Moakler. The three finalists appeared on the CBS daytime talk show The Talk. Online voting determined the winner, and James O'Halloran became the newest cast member. He first appeared on the episode which aired on December 15, 2014. He has since been joined by a third male model, former NFL player Devin Goda, who joined the show during season 47.

Documentary films
 Come On Down, a 1984 BBC produced documentary about American game shows.
 Come On Down! The Game Show Story, a 2014 ITV British documentary mini-series presented by Bradley Walsh.
 Come on Down!, a 2016 documentary about two friends who venture from Boston to Cali to crack the greatest game show in television history.
 Perfect Bid: The Contestant Who Knew Too Much was released on October 13, 2017, and was directed by CJ Wallis and was produced by FortyFPS Productions and MK Ultra Productions. It explores how contestant Ted Slauson became adept at memorizing the prices of the prizes and products on the show since its inception in 1972, culminating in Slauson's helping contestant Terry Kniess bid perfectly on a showcase in 2008. It became one of the biggest controversies in game-show history, and was covered by Time, Esquire, TMZ and other publications. The film features guest appearances by Bob Barker, Roger Dobkowitz, Kevin Pollak and Drew Carey.

Prizes
As of November 2009, the show had given away approximately $250 million in cash and prizes. Furs have not been offered as prizes since Barker's tenure as host (although wool and leather are now permitted). Several Barker-imposed prohibitions have been lifted since his departure, such as offering products made of leather or leather seats in vehicles and showing simulated meat props on barbecues and in ovens. The show has also offered couture clothing and accessories, featuring designers such as Coach Inc., Louis Vuitton, and Limited Brands in an attempt to attract a younger demographic, as well as backyard play equipment such as JumpSport Trampolines and electronics such as smartphones, personal computer systems, video game systems and entertainment centers. Other prizes which have frequently appeared on the show since its beginnings include automobiles, furniture, trips and cash. The most expensive prize offered on this version of the show was a Ferrari 458 Italia Spider sports car, priced at $285,716, that appeared on the April 25, 2013, episode during "Big Money Week." The prize was offered during the 3 Strikes pricing game. Prior to this, the most expensive prize was a Tesla Roadster (2008) (valued at $112,845), featured on the April 22, 2010, episode in the pricing game Golden Road.

Since Carey took over as host, prizes from Ohio-based companies or companies with major Ohio operations have appeared, as Ohio is the home state of Carey and former announcer Fields. This has included Honda (see below), as well as Jeni's Splendid Ice Creams, which is based in Columbus, Ohio and got its start in Columbus's historic North Market.

Automobiles
Since the show's debut, automobiles have been a signature prize on The Price Is Right. Most hour-long episodes have two pricing games that are each played for an automobile and in most episodes (although not all), at least one showcase will include an automobile. For special episodes, such as the 5,000th episode, there will often be more cars offered.

From 1991 to 2008, almost all automobiles offered on the show were made by companies based in the United States, specifically Detroit's Big Three (although cars made by these companies' foreign subsidiaries or in a joint-venture with a foreign company were also offered during this era, in all cases badged under an American nameplate). The move was made by Barker, in his capacity as executive producer, as a sign of patriotism during the first Iraq war in 1991 and as a show of support to the American car industry, which was particularly struggling at that time. When Chrysler merged with German automaker Daimler-Benz in 1998 to form Daimler Chrysler AG (now simply Daimler AG after Chrysler split from the automaker; Chrysler later merged with Italian automaker Fiat to form Fiat Chrysler Automobiles and following another merger with French automaker PSA Group to form the Dutch-based Stellantis), the foreign ownership of Chrysler did not affect carrying any Chrysler-related models.

Since Barker's retirement, cars made by foreign companies have been offered, most notably Honda, which has several factories throughout Ohio. Through product placement, certain episodes in 2008 and 2009 featured Honda as the exclusive automobile manufacturer for vehicles offered on that episode. The major European (Volkswagen, BMW, Daimler, Fiat and Volvo) and Asian (Hyundai-Kia, Toyota, Mitsubishi, Mazda, Nissan, Honda and VinFast) manufacturers have all provided cars on the show since the ban was lifted, with premium foreign cars almost exclusively used for games that generally offer higher-priced cars, such as Golden Road and 3 Strikes. Starting around 2010, vintage and classic cars have occasionally been offered as prizes for games that do not involve pricing them. Among them have been a 1955 Chevrolet Bel Air and a 1964 Bentley S3. These cars are usually offered in games where their prices are irrelevant to gameplay, such as Hole in One and Bonus Game.

Winnings records
The record for the largest individual total in cash and prizes on a daytime episode is held by Michael Strouber. On the October 14, 2019 episode, which aired during Big Money Week, Strouber won $202,000 (one $200,000 chip, one zero, and two $1,000 chips) in cash during a playing of Plinko. During the episode, game rules were modified to offer a top prize of $1,000,000, with each chip worth up to $200,000. Strouber walked away with $262,743 in cash and prizes, including a new car, a diamond tennis bracelet and a trip to Fiji.

The record for winnings on the primetime show is currently held by Adam Rose. On February 22, 2008, the first The Price Is Right $1,000,000 Spectacular episode since Carey became host, Rose won $20,000 playing Grand Game. By being within $1,000 of the actual retail price of his own showcases, he won both showcases—which included a Cadillac XLR convertible in his showcase and a Ford Escape Hybrid in his opponent's—plus a $1 million bonus. Rose's total is also the record for winnings on any version of the Price franchise worldwide, shattering the previous mark set by Joanne Segeviano on the Australian version in 2005.

Terry Kniess holds the record for the closest bid on a showcase without going over, guessing the exact price of the showcase he was given. Kniess, an avid viewer of the show, recorded and watched every episode for four months prior to when he and his wife had tickets to attend in September 2008. Kniess learned that many prizes were repeatedly used (always at the same price) and began taking notes. Kniess was selected as a contestant on September 22, 2008, lost his pricing game (the only contestant to do so that episode), made it to the final showcase and guessed the exact amount of $23,743 for his showcase. Many show staffers, including Carey, were worried that the show was rigged and that Kniess was cheating. Kniess later explained that he had seen all three items of the showcase before and knew the general prices in the thousands. The 743 he used because it was his PIN, based on his wedding date and his wife's birth month.

Carey attributed his subdued reaction to the perfect bid by saying, "Everybody thought someone had cheated. We'd just fired Roger Dobkowitz, and all the fan groups were upset about it. I remember asking, 'Are we ever going to air this?' And nobody could see how we could. So I thought the show was never going to air. I thought somebody had cheated us, and I thought the whole show was over. I thought they were going to shut us down, and I thought I was going to be out of a job." Kniess later defended his actions, claiming that he never cheated, and in the end, was awarded his prizes. (His feat can be comparable to the actions of Michael Larson, who appeared on the 1980s CBS game show Press Your Luck, and won $110,237 by memorizing the board sequence.)

Reception

Critical reaction
The Price Is Right has generally been praised and remained a stalwart in television ratings over its long history. In a 2007 article, TV Guide named the program the "greatest game show of all time." The introduction of the program ushered in a new era of game shows—moving away from the knowledge-based quiz show format, creating "a noisy, carnival atmosphere that challenged cultural norms and assumptions represented in previous generations of quiz shows."

The show's early reception was not as universally positive, as critics lamented the show's stark departure from the highbrow norms of the Golden Age of Television; original nighttime host Dennis James admitted that even his own housekeeper did not watch the show for that reason, but also defended the series, saying "CBS, who never wanted game shows, just put three game shows on the air, so they know they had better join the fight or lose out, because game shows have a tremendous appeal. The critics will always look down their noses, but you can't have The Bell Telephone Hour on and still stay in competition. If you want to read books, read books."

Controversy
Since the mid-1990s, the program production company and in some cases the executive producer (both Barker and Richards, the executive producer from 2009 to 2019) have been sued by numerous women. Most of the lawsuits involved models and other staff members in cases of sexual harassment, wrongful termination and racial discrimination. Allegations of sexual harassment brought by Dian Parkinson led to Barker calling a press conference to admit a past consensual sexual relationship with her, while denying any harassment, explaining that she was only angry with him for calling off the relationship. Barker was widowed in 1981 following the death of his wife, Dorothy Jo. It has also been alleged that Barker and senior staff created a hostile work environment, particularly to those who testified for the plaintiffs suing Barker. Responding to the controversy just before his retirement, Barker told William Keck of USA Today, "They have been such a problem. I don't want to say anything about them. They [were] disgusting, I don't want to mention them." The Barker-era lawsuits, except for one, were settled out of court. After Barker dropped his slander suit against Hallstrom, she eventually countersued and received millions in settlement. Former model Lanisha Cole filed a sexual harassment lawsuit against the show's producers in 2011; it was settled in 2013.

The lawsuits for Price affected the popular syndicated game show Jeopardy!, as Mike Richards (who had been named host of the show before resigning in the span of nine days) was executive producer for Price from 2008 to 2019.

Merchandise
The Price Is Right has expanded beyond television to home, live stage shows and casino-based games.

DVD release
A four-disc DVD box set, titled The Best of "The Price Is Right", was released on March 25, 2008. The set features four episodes of the 1956–1965 Bill Cullen series, 17 episodes of the Barker 1972–1975 daytime series and the final five daytime episodes hosted by Barker. In accordance with Barker's animal-rights wishes, which remain in effect beyond his retirement, any episodes with fur coats as prizes cannot be aired or released onto home media formats. This includes the first three daytime shows recorded in 1972, plus most of the 1970s syndicated run.

Board games
Seven board games have been produced. One of them was a variation of a card game, using prizes and price tags from the 1956 version. The second was based more closely on the original version of the show.

Three games were produced during the 1970s by Milton Bradley, with Contestants' Row, some pricing games and, in the case of the third version, a spinner for the Big Wheel. In the first two versions, decks of cards had various grocery items, small prizes and larger prizes. The third version simply had cards for each game that included ten sets of "right" answers, all using the same price choices. The instruction book specified what color cards were necessary for each round.

The 1986 version, again by Milton Bradley, was similar in scope to the earlier version, with new prizes and more games, but lacking the Big Wheel. The instruction book refers to Contestants' Row as the "Qualifying Round" and the pricing games as "Solo Games." The book also instructs players to use items priced under $100 as One Bids. The 1998 version of the game, by Endless Games, was virtually identical to the 1986 release, with the same games, prizes, and even the same prices. The only changes were that the number tiles were made of cardboard bits instead of plastic and the cars from the deck of prizes with four-digit prices were removed.

The 2004 version, again by Endless Games, was a complete departure from previous home versions. Instead of different prize cards and games, the game consisted of everything needed to play 45 games and enough materials to create all the games not technically included if the "host" wished to and knew their rules. The Big Wheel spinner was also restored, this time with the numbers in the correct order. Additionally, the prices, instead of being random numbers that could change each time the game was played, were actual prices taken from episodes of the TV show. To fit everything in the box, grocery items and prizes were listed in the instruction book and games were played on dry erase boards. A spinner determined the game to be played next, although its use was not necessarily required if the "host" wished to build his own game lineup, or even use a pricing game not included in the lineup.

Computer and electronic games

In 1990, GameTek created a Price Is Right computer game for the DOS and Commodore 64 platforms and other systems to fit in their line of other game show games. A handheld Tiger game was made in 1998 with four pricing games. A DVD game with 12 pricing games, live casino show host Todd Newton and video of prizes taken directly from the show was produced by Endless Games in 2005. A 2008 DVD edition, also from Endless Games, featured many changes based on season 36 and included seven new games: Half Off, More or Less, Swap Meet, Secret X, That's Too Much, Coming or Going, and Hole in One. It also featured both host Drew Carey and announcer Rich Fields. CBS.com featured an online Price Is Right-based game in the late 1990s, which was plugged in the closing credits of each episode. The game consisted of choosing which of the four bidders in Contestant's Row was closest to the price of a prize without going over. Additionally, Mobliss provides a suite of pricing games for cellular phones.

On March 26, 2008, Ludia (in connection with Ubisoft) launched The Price Is Right video game for PC. A version for the Wii and Nintendo DS platforms was released in September 2008, while a version for the iOS was released in November 2008. The show's then-current announcer, Rich Fields, was the host of the computer version. The virtual set in the game resembled the set used in Seasons 31 to 34. Ludia announced that all three platforms will receive a new version of the video game that was previewed at the Target Bullseye Lounge during the Electronic Entertainment Expo trade show on June 2–4, 2009. The Price Is Right 2010 Edition was released on September 22, 2009. In the fall of 2010, Ludia developed a multi-player version for Facebook. A third Ludia adaptation, The Price Is Right Decades, featuring set designs, pricing games and prizes taken from the 1970s through 2000s, was initially released for the Wii in October 2011, with an Xbox 360 and iOS release following in November and December. The Price Is Right 2010 Edition and The Price Is Right Decades have also been released as downloads within the PlayStation Store for the PlayStation 3 in May 2010 and April 2012, respectively. Irwin Toys released an electronic tabletop version in 2008 featuring Contestant's Row, the Big Wheel, a physical Plinko board with chips, Showcases and seven pricing games. Jakks Pacific released a Plug It in and Play version of The Price Is Right in 2009, featuring Carey and Fields.

Slot machines

A series of video slot machines were manufactured for North American casinos by International Game Technology. Although gameplay varies by machine, each feature themes and motifs found on the show, including the Showcase Showdown, with themes used following Carey's start as host. Others feature pricing games as gameplay elements, including Plinko, Cliff Hangers, Punch a Bunch, Dice Game, and Money Game.

Scratch-off tickets

A scratchcard version of the game is being offered by several U.S. and Canadian state/provincial lotteries, featuring adaptations of Plinko, Cliff Hangers, the Showcase Showdown and the Showcase. The top prize varies with each version.

Live casino game

After the 30th anniversary episode taped in Las Vegas in 2002, Harrah's and RTL Group began producing live licensed shows (dubbed The Price Is Right Live!) at their venues, with several performers, including Roger Lodge, Newton, and Gray hosting, with West, Rosen, and Dave Walls announcing.

Come on Down Tour!
In 2022, the show launched a coast-to-coast tour of live events celebrating the show's 50th anniversary. Contestants had "a chance to play Plinko, spin the wheel, and compete in a Showcase"  to win prizes, and had a chance to win an additional $50,000. The tour visited 50 locations and stopped in Los Angeles, Denver, Dallas, New Orleans, Nashville, St. Louis, Cleveland (the hometown of the show's current host Drew Carey) and New York. In October 2022, the tour returned as part of a special weekend event along with the celebration of Carey's 15th season as host sponsored by the Paley Center for Media called PaleyWKND. In addition, Drew Carey, George Gray and Devin Goda were scheduled to be there in person.

References

Citations

Works cited

External links
 
  at CBS.com
  at FremantleMedia.com
 

1972 American television series debuts
1970s American game shows
1980s American game shows
1990s American game shows
2000s American game shows
2010s American game shows
2020s American game shows
CBS original programming
Daytime Emmy Award for Outstanding Game Show winners
English-language television shows
First-run syndicated television programs in the United States
Television series by Fremantle (company)
Television series by Mark Goodson-Bill Todman Productions
The Price Is Right
Television series by CBS Studios
Television shows filmed in Los Angeles
Television productions suspended due to the COVID-19 pandemic